The Journal of Chromatography A is a peer-reviewed scientific journal publishing research papers in analytical chemistry, with a focus on techniques and methods used for the separation and identification of mixtures.

Indexed by ISI the journal received an impact factor of 4.169 as reported in the 2014 Journal Citation Reports by Thomson Reuters, ranking it 15th out of 79 journals in the category “Biochemical Research Methods” and ranking it sixth out of 74 journals in the category “Chemistry, analytical”.

See also 
 Journal of Chromatography B

References

External links 
 

Chemistry journals
Publications established in 1958
Elsevier academic journals
Weekly journals
English-language journals